My Old Man or my old man may refer to:

 One's father

Film and television
My Old Man (film), a 1979 American television film based on a story by Ernest Hemingway (see below)
My Old Man (2004 film), a Canadian short shown at the 2004 Toronto International Film Festival
My Old Man (TV series), a 1970s British sitcom starring Clive Dunn
"My Old Man" (Scrubs), a television episode

Literature
"My Old Man" (short story), a 1923 story by Ernest Hemingway
My Old Man, a 2004 novel by Amy Sohn

Music
My Old Man (album), a Steve Goodman tribute album, 2006
"My Old Man" (Rodney Atkins song), 2002
"My Old Man" (Zac Brown Band song), 2017
"My Old Man (Said Follow the Van)" or "Don't Dilly Dally on the Way", a 1919 music hall song, or a football chant based on it
"My Old Man", a song by Anika Moa from In Swings the Tide, 2007
"My Old Man", a song by Ian Dury from New Boots and Panties!!, 1977
"My Old Man", a song by Joni Mitchell from Blue, 1971
"My Old Man", a song by Mac DeMarco from This Old Dog, 2017
"My Old Man", a song by Steve Goodman
"My Old Man", a song by the Walkmen from Bows + Arrows, 2004

See also
Under My Skin (1950 film), a 1950 film based on Hemingway's story
Old man (disambiguation)
This Old Man